Serbian football clubs have participated in European football competitions since its formation, in 1955. It was a game including a Serbian club that marked the kick-off of UEFA European club competitions. It was played on September 4, 1955, in Estádio Nacional in Lisbon, between Portuguese champions Sporting CP, and Yugoslav champions, Partizan (a 3–3 draw, later Partizan won 5–2 in Belgrade). Serbian clubs were by a large margin the most representative among all republics of former Yugoslavia. During Yugoslav periods, Serbian clubs played 3 finals, with the highlight happening in 1991 when Red Star Belgrade became European and world champions.

Serbia is considered by FIFA and UEFA to be the only official successor of both the Yugoslavia and Serbia and Montenegro national teams,
Before 1992, Serbia was a part of Yugoslavia and between 1992 and 2006, Serbia was part of FR Yugoslavia and Serbia and Montenegro.

All statistics and records are accurate as of 17 August 2020.

UEFA coefficient and ranking 
For the 2023–24 UEFA competitions, the associations will be allocated places according to their 2022 UEFA country coefficients, which will take into account their performance in European competitions from 2017–18 to 2021–22. In the 2022 rankings used to allocate berths for the 2023–24 European competitions, Serbia's coefficient points total will be 33.375. After earning a score of 9.500 during the 2020–21 European campaign, Serbia moved up to the 11th best association in Europe out of 54 for this season.

 https://kassiesa.net/uefa/data/method5/crank2022.html Full list]

Finals

Competitions

Active

European Cup/Champions League

SFR Yugoslavia era (1955–1992)

FR Yugoslavia / Serbia and Montenegro era (1992–2006)

Serbia era (2006–present)

UEFA Cup/Europa League

SFR Yugoslavia era (1971–1992)

FR Yugoslavia / Serbia and Montenegro era (1992–2006)

Serbia era (2006–present) 

1 UEFA expelled Partizan from the 2007–08 UEFA Cup due to crowd trouble at their away tie in Mostar, which forced the match to be interrupted for 10 minutes. UEFA adjudged travelling Partizan fans to have been the culprits of the trouble, but Partizan were allowed to play the return leg while the appeal was being processed. However, Partizan's appeal was rejected so Zrinjski Mostar qualified.

UEFA Europa Conference League

Defunct

Inter-Cities Fairs Cup

SFR Yugoslavia era (1958–1971) 

1 Belgrade XI progressed to the Quarter finals after beating Leipzig XI 2–0 on a play-off match.

2 Red Star Belgrade progressed to the Quarter finals after winning a play-off match 1–0.

3 Juventus won 1–0 in a play-off to advance to the second round.

4 Lokomotiv Plovdiv won 2–0 in a play-off to advance to the second round.

Cup Winners' Cup

SFR Yugoslavia era (1960–1992)

FR Yugoslavia era (1992–1999)

Intertoto Cup (only UEFA-administered)

SFR Yugoslavia era (1960–1988)

FR Yugoslavia / Serbia and Montenegro era (1995–2006)

Serbia era (2006–2008)

References

External links
UEFA Website

European football clubs in international competitions